Christian social may refer to:
 Christian left
 Christian socialism, a political ideology.
 Christian Social Party (disambiguation), a list of parties of which some do and some do not adhere to this ideology.
 The self-described ideology of the Christian Union (Netherlands)